Pseudodaphnella philippinensis, common name the Philippine turrid, is a species of sea snail, a marine gastropod mollusk in the family Raphitomidae.

Subspecies
 Pseudodaphnella philippinensis elongata Hervier, 1897
 Pseudodaphnella philippinensis major Hervier, 1897

Description
The size of the shell varies between 8 mm and 15 mm.

The white shell is ventricose and rather transparent. It is longitudinally ribbed with very delicate ribs, rather compressed, somewhat distant, and variously painted with black or chestnut and opaque-white. 

This species is the type of the genus Pseudodaphnella. Hervier has already noticed that it is subject to considerable variation in size, disposition of colour, number of radial ribs, and density of spiral cords. On the body whorl of an example from Cape Grenville Ch. Hedley counted thirty-four spirals. The apex of a shell Ch. Hedley  gathered alive at Murray Island is small, brown, and of two whorls, the first finely spirally grooved, the second with numerous close fine radial riblets.

Distribution
This marine species occurs off Taiwan, the Philippines; New Caledonia and Queensland, Australia

References

 Allan, J.K. 1950. Australian shells: with related animals living in the sea, in freshwater and on the land. Melbourne : Georgian House xix, 470 pp., 45 pls, 112 text figs.
 Liu, J.Y. [Ruiyu] (ed.). (2008). Checklist of marine biota of China seas. China Science Press. 1267 pp.
 Springsteen, F.J. & Leobrera, F.M. 1986. Shells of the Philippines. Manila : Carfel Seashell Museum 377 pp., 100 pls.
 Powell, A.W.B. 1966. The molluscan families Speightiidae and Turridae, an evaluation of the valid taxa, both Recent and fossil, with list of characteristic species. Bulletin of the Auckland Institute and Museum. Auckland, New Zealand 5: 1–184, pls 1–23

External links
 Reeve, L.A. 1843. Monograph of the genus Pleurotoma. pls 1–18 in Reeve, L.A. (ed.). Conchologica Iconica. London : L. Reeve & Co. Vol. 1
  Melvill J.C. & Standen R. (1896) Notes on a collection of shells from Lifu and Uvea, Loyalty Islands, formed by the Rev. James and Mrs. Hadfield, with list of species. Part II. Journal of Conchology 8: 273-315 
 MNHN, Paris : specimen
 Gastropods.com: Pseudodaphnella philippinensis
 
 Fedosov A. E. & Puillandre N. (2012) Phylogeny and taxonomy of the Kermia–Pseudodaphnella (Mollusca: Gastropoda: Raphitomidae) genus complex: a remarkable radiation via diversification of larval development. Systematics and Biodiversity 10(4): 447-477
 Li B.-Q. [Baoquan & Li X.-Z. [Xinzheng] (2014) Report on the Raphitomidae Bellardi, 1875 (Mollusca: Gastropoda: Conoidea) from the China Seas. Journal of Natural History 48(17-18): 999-1025]

philippinensis
Gastropods described in 1843